Herscher is a German-language surname. Notable people with this surname include:

Jeanne Herscher-Clément (1878 - 1941), French pianist and composer
Joseph Herscher, YouTube personality known for his channel Joseph's Machines
Penny Herscher an American executive in electronic design automation industry, formerly with Cadence Design Systems
Uri D. Herscher (born  1941), American rabbi and academic

See also
Herrscher (disambiguation)

German-language surnames